Events in the year 1734 in Norway.

Incumbents
Monarch: Christian VI

Events
The first city fire in Kristiansand.

Arts and literature

Dolstad Church  was built.

Births
8 January - Niels Carlsen, shipowner and timber merchant (died 1809).

Deaths

See also

References